Mayang is a term used by the Meiteis in Manipur to refer to non-Manipuri Indians, especially the speakers of Hindustani language and Bengali people But historically the term has been used to denote the Bishnupriya Manipuris and Bengalis, who are considered by Meiteis to be outsiders in Manipur. The term was later casually used to denote 'foreigner' during the militancy in Manipur, which effectively translated to Indians from outside the state. Indians in general and Bengalis in particular became the targets of attacks. According to journalist Kishalay Bhattacharjee, the term is synonymous to Dkhar in Meghalaya.

Usage 
The term is used for who are not from Manipuri. It is a term which means foreigner in Manipuri dialect.

Kwak Mayang 
The Corvus splendens or Indian crow is known as Mayang Kwak in Meitei language. The Meiteis maintain that Indian crow originally was not native to Manipur. As it arrived from the west, it is known as Mayang Kwak, literally meaning 'foreign crow' or 'western crow'. Australian dancer Louise Lightfoot has recorded in her memoir a popular game among the Meitei children called 'Kwak Mayang', literally meaning 'foreign crow'. The children cling behind each forming a moving line. The leader swerves the direction of the movement as if dodging attacks from the foreign crow that is attacking them from the front. During her travel in Manipur, little boys used to jeer at her calling her Mayang and older boys used to laugh out at her harassment.

Mayang Hatlo 
Militants raised the violent war cry of 'Mayang Hatlo!', literally meaning 'Foreigners go back!'. As the movement gained momentum across the state, general Manipuris got involved in it. Young boys armed with knives and lathis terrorized the streets.

See also 
 Dkhar
 Bongal
 Malaun

References 

Ethnic and religious slurs
Racism in India
Hate speech
Meitei language
Persecution of Bengali Hindus